Alejandro Eugenio Guido Pérez (born March 22, 1994) is an American professional soccer player who plays as a defensive midfielder for San Diego Loyal in the USL Championship.

Early life
Guido who is of Mexican descent, grew up in the San Diego area and attended Mater Dei High School, where he played on the soccer team.

Club career
After a trial with Dutch club Vitesse Arnhem,  Guido signed a three-year deal with Club Tijuana in Mexico in March 2012, on the eve of his 18th birthday.

Guido began playing for Club Tijuana's U-20 team in the 2012-13 season, but on August 22, 2012 made his professional debut in a 2-1 victory over Celaya in a Copa MX match.

Gudio had a loan spell with Ascenso MX side Dorados during the 2013-14 season, playing six times for them in the Copa MX.

On February 27, 2019, Guido joined Major League Soccer side Los Angeles FC.

On September 1, 2020, Guido moved on loan to USL Championship side San Diego Loyal for the remainder of the season.

Following his release from Los Angeles after the 2020 season, Guido joined San Diego permanently on March 4, 2021.

International career
Guido was a member of the United States national under-17 team during the 2011 FIFA U-17 World Cup. He received his first senior team call-up ahead of a May 28, 2018 friendly against Bolivia but did not appear in the match after straining his groin during training.

Honors
United States U17
CONCACAF U-17 Championship: 2011

Individual
USL Championship All League Second Team: 2022

Notes

References

External links
 
 
 Soccerway profile

1994 births
Living people
American soccer players
American expatriate soccer players
Club Tijuana footballers
American sportspeople of Mexican descent
Association football midfielders
Soccer players from San Diego
Expatriate footballers in Mexico
United States men's youth international soccer players
United States men's under-20 international soccer players
United States men's under-23 international soccer players
Liga MX players
Los Angeles FC players
San Diego Loyal SC players
USL Championship players